Arlington Square Business Park is a business park in Bracknell, England, owned and operated by Goodman Group.

The park houses a number of well-known companies, including Novell, Fujitsu and Ally Financial.

References

External links 
 Arlington Square Business Park website

Bracknell
Business parks of England
High-technology business districts in the United Kingdom